A children's song may be a nursery rhyme set to music, a song that children invent and share among themselves or a modern creation intended for entertainment, use in the home or education. Although children's songs have been recorded and studied in some cultures more than others, they appear to be universal in human society.

Categories
Iona and Peter Opie, pioneers of the academic study of children's culture, divided children's songs into two classes: those taught to children by adults, which when part of a traditional culture they saw as nursery rhymes, and those that children taught to each other, which formed part of the independent culture of childhood. A further use of the term children's song is for songs written for the entertainment or education of children, usually in the modern era. In practice none of these categories is entirely discrete, since, for example, children often reuse and adapt nursery rhymes, and many songs now considered as traditional were deliberately written by adults for commercial ends.

The Opies further divided nursery rhymes into a number of groups, including

Amusements (including action songs)
Counting rhymes
Lullabies
Riddles

Playground or children's street rhymes they sub-divided into two major groups: those associated with games and those that were entertainments, with the second category including

Improper verses
Jingles
Joke rhymes
Nonsense verse
Macabre rhymes
Parodies
Popular songs
Slogans
Tongue-twisters

In addition, since the advent of popular music publication in the nineteenth century, a large number of songs have been produced for and often adopted by children. Many of these imitate the form of nursery rhymes, and a number have come to be accepted as such. They can be seen to have arisen from a number of sources, including:
Film
Publishing
Recording

Nursery or Mother Goose rhymes

The term nursery rhyme is used for "traditional" songs for young children in Britain and many English speaking countries; but this usage dates only from the nineteenth century, and in North America the older Mother Goose rhyme is still often used. The oldest children's songs of which we have records are lullabies, which can be found in every human culture. The Roman nurses' lullaby, "Lalla, Lalla, Lalla, aut dormi, aut lacte", may be the oldest to survive. Many medieval English verses associated with the birth of Jesus (including "Lullay, my liking, my dere son, my sweting") take the form of a lullabies and may be adaptations of contemporary lullabies.

However, most of those used today date from the seventeenth century onwards. Some rhymes are medieval or sixteenth-century in origin, including "To market, to market" and "Cock a doodle doo", but most were not written down until the eighteenth century, when the publishing of children's books began to move towards entertainment. The first English collections were Tommy Thumb's Song Book and a sequel, Tommy Thumb's Pretty Song Book, both thought to have been published before 1744, and at this point such songs were known as "Tommy Thumb's songs". The publication of John Newbery's Mother Goose's Melody; or, Sonnets for the Cradle (c. 1785) is the first record we have of many classic rhymes still in use today. These rhymes seem to have come from a variety of sources, including traditional riddles, proverbs, ballads, lines of mummers' plays, drinking songs, historical events, and, it has been suggested, ancient pagan rituals. Roughly half of the current body of recognised "traditional" English rhymes were known by the mid-eighteenth century.

In the early nineteenth century, printed collections of rhymes began to spread to other countries, including Robert Chambers's Popular Rhymes of Scotland (1826) and, in the United States, Mother Goose's Melodies (1833). We sometimes know the origins and authors of rhymes from this period, such as "Twinkle Twinkle Little Star", which combined an eighteenth-century French tune with a poem by the English writer Jane Taylor, and "Mary Had a Little Lamb", written by Sarah Josepha Hale of Boston in 1830. Nursery rhymes were also often collected by early folk-song collectors, including, in Scotland, Sir Walter Scott and, in Germany, Clemens Brentano and Achim von Arnim in Des Knaben Wunderhorn (1806–08). The first, and possibly the most important, academic collections to focus in this area were James Orchard Halliwell's The Nursery Rhymes of England (1842) and Popular Rhymes and Tales (1849). By the time of Sabine Baring-Gould's A Book of Nursery Songs (1895), child folklore had become an academic study, full of comments and footnotes. The early years of the twentieth century are notable for the addition of sophisticated illustrations to books of children's songs, including Caldecott's Hey Diddle Diddle Picture Book (1909) and Arthur Rackham's Mother Goose (1913). The definitive study of English rhymes remains the work of Iona and Peter Opie.

Children's playground and street songs 

In contrast to nursery rhymes, which are learned in childhood and passed from adults to children only after a gap of 20 to 40 years, children's playground and street songs, like much children's lore, are learned and passed on almost immediately. The Opies noted that this had two important effects: the rapid transmission of new and adjusted versions of songs, which could cover a country like Great Britain in perhaps a month by exclusively oral transmission, and the process of "wear and repair", in which songs were changed, modified and fixed as words and phrases were forgotten, misunderstood or updated.

Origins of songs
Some rhymes collected in the mid-twentieth century can be seen to have origins as early in the eighteenth century. Where sources could be identified, they could often be traced to popular adult songs, including ballads and those in music hall and minstrel shows.  They were also studied in  19th century New York. Children also have a tendency to recycle nursery rhymes, children's commercial songs and adult music in satirical versions. A good example is the theme from the mid-1950s Disney film Davy Crockett, King of the Wild Frontier, "The Ballad of Davy Crockett", with a tune by George Bruns; its opening lines, "Born on a mountain top in Tennessee / The greenest state in the land of the free", were endlessly satirised to make Crockett a spaceman, a parricide and even a Teddy Boy.

Action songs
Some of the most popular playground songs include actions to be done with the words. Among the most famous of these is "I'm a Little Teapot". A term from the song is now commonly used in cricket to describe a disgruntled bowler's stance when a catch has been dropped. A 'teapot' involves standing with one hand on your hip in disappointment, a 'double teapot'  involves both hands on hips and a disapproving glare.

Game songs
Many children's playground and street songs are connected to particular games. These include clapping games, like "Miss Susie', played in America; "A sailor went to sea" from Britain; and "Mpeewa", played in parts of Africa. Many traditional Māori children's games, some of them with educational applications—such as hand movement, stick and string games—were accompanied by particular songs. In the Congo, the traditional game "A Wa Nsabwee" is played by two children synchronising hand and other movements while singing. Skipping games like Double Dutch have been seen as important in the formation of hip hop and rap music.

If a playground song does have a character, it is usually a child present at the time of the song's performance or the child singing the song. Awkward relations between young boys and girls is a common motif, as in the American playground song, jump-rope rhyme, or taunt "K-I-S-S-I-N-G", spelt aloud. The song is learned by oral tradition:

Pastime songs
Other songs have a variety of patterns and contexts. Many of the verses used by children have an element of transgression, and a number have satirical aims. The parody of adult songs with alternative verses, such as the rewriting of "While shepherds watched their flocks by night" to "While shepherds washed their socks at night" and numerous other versions, was a prominent activity in the British playgrounds investigated by the Opies in the twentieth century. With the growth of media and advertising in some countries, advertising jingles and parodies of those jingles have become a regular feature of children's songs, including the "McDonald's song" in the United States, which played against adult desire for ordered and healthy eating. Humour is a major factor in children's songs. (The nature of the English language, with its many double meanings for words, may mean that it possesses more punning songs than other cultures, although they are found in other cultures—for example, China). Nonsense verses and songs, like those of Edward Lear and Lewis Carroll, have been a major feature of publications for children, and some of these have been absorbed by children, although many such verses seem to have been invented by children themselves.

Parodies and satire
Playground songs can be parodies of popular songs such as "On Top of Old Smoky" or "The Battle Hymn of the Republic" in the US with suitably altered lyrics. The new lyrics are frequently highly derisive towards figures of authority such as teachers or involve ribald lyrical variations. Zero-tolerance rules in some schools now prevent this, although they are sometimes ignored by teachers who view the songs as harmless and clever.

Playground songs may also feature contemporary children's characters or child actors such as Popeye, Shirley Temple, Batman or Barney the Dinosaur. Such songs are usually set to common melodies (a popular Batman-themed song uses much of the chorus of "Jingle Bells") and often include subversive and crude humor; in Barney's case, schoolyard parodies of his theme song were a driving force behind a massive backlash against Barney in the 1990s.

Influence
Occasionally the songs are used as a base for modern pop songs, "Circle Circle Dot Dot", commonly sung in American playgrounds, has been recorded as a rap song.

Commercial children's music

Commercial children's music grew out of the popular music-publishing industry associated with New York's Tin Pan Alley in the late nineteenth and early twentieth centuries. Early songs included "Ten little fingers and ten little toes" by Ira Shuster and Edward G. Nelson and "School Days" (1907) by Gus Edwards and Will Cobb. Perhaps the best remembered now is "Teddy Bears' Picnic", with lyrics written by Jimmy Kennedy in 1932, although the tune, by the British composer John Walter Bratton, was composed in 1907. As recording technology developed, children's songs were soon being sold on record; in 1888, the first recorded discs (called "plates") offered for sale included Mother Goose nursery rhymes. The earliest record catalogues of several seminal firms in the recording industry—such as Edison, Berliner, and Victor—contained separate children's sections. Until the 1950s, all the major record companies produced albums for children, mostly based on popular cartoons or nursery rhymes and read by major stars of theatre or film. The role of Disney in children's cinema from the 1930s meant that it gained a unique place in the production of children's music, beginning with "Minnies Yoo Hoo" (1930). After the production of its first feature-length animation, Snow White and the Seven Dwarves (1937), with its highly successful score by Frank Churchill and Larry Morey, the mould was set for a combination of animation, fairy tale and distinctive songs that would carry through to the 1970s with songs from films such as Pinocchio (1940) and Song of the South (1946).

The mid-twentieth century baby boomers provided a growing market for children's music. Woody Guthrie, Pete Seeger, and Ella Jenkins were among the politically progressive and socially conscious performers who aimed albums at children. Novelty recordings like "Rudolph the Red-Nosed Reindeer" (a Montgomery Ward jingle that became a book and later a classic children's movie) and the fictional music group Alvin and the Chipmunks were among the most commercially successful music ventures of the time. In the 1960s, as the baby boomers matured and became more politically aware, they embraced both the substance and politics of folk ("the people's") music. Peter, Paul, and Mary, The Limeliters and Tom Paxton were acclaimed folk artists of the period who wrote albums for children. In the 1970s, television programmes like Sesame Street became the dominant force in children's music. In the early 1990s, the songwriter, record producer, and performer Bobby Susser emerged with his award-winning children's songs and series, Bobby Susser Songs for Children, that exemplified the use of songs to educate young children in schools and at home. Disney also re-entered the market for animated musical features with The Little Mermaid (1989), from which the song "Under the Sea" won an Oscar, becoming the first of a string of Oscar–winning Disney songs.

The twenty-first century has seen an increase in the number of independent children's music artists, with acts like Dan Zanes, Cathy Bollinger, and Laurie Berkner getting wide exposure on cable TV channels targeted at children. The band Trout Fishing in America has achieved great acclaim by continuing the tradition of merging sophisticated folk music with family-friendly lyrics,, and rock-oriented acts like They Might Be Giants have released albums marketed directly to children, such as No!, Here Come the ABCs, Here Come the 123s and Here Comes Science.

Selected discography 
 Simon Mayor and Hilary James, Lullabies with Mandolins (2004) and Children's Favourites from Acoustics (2005)
 Mike and Peggy Seeger, American Folk Songs for Children (1955)
 Isla St Clair, My Generation (2003)
 Broadside Band, Old English Nursery Rhymes
 Tim Hart and Friends, My Very Favourite Nursery Rhyme Record (1981)
 Bobby Susser, Wiggle Wiggle and Other Exercises (1996)
 Various artists, Hello Children Everywhere, Vols. 1–4 (EMI Records, 1988–1991)

See also 
 List of children's songs

Notes

Further reading
 Iona and Peter Opie, The Lore and Language of Schoolchildren (Oxford: Oxford University Press, 1959)
 Bronner, Simon J. American Children's Folklore  (August House, 1988)
 Brian Sutton-Smith, Jay Mechling, Thomas W. Johnson, Felicia McMahon (ed.) Children's Folklore: A SourceBook (Routledge, 2012)

External links 
 BBC Page with lyrics of British Playground Songs
 http://www.preschoolrainbow.org/preschool-rhymes.htm
 Miss Lucy's Playground Songs

Song forms
 
Song